Eldridge Township is an inactive township in Laclede County, in the U.S. state of Missouri.

Eldridge Township was established in 1874, and named after S. N. Eldridge, a pioneer citizen.

References

Townships in Missouri
Townships in Laclede County, Missouri